

Alpine skiing

Men's events

Women's events

Biathlon

Bobsleigh

Cross-country skiing

Men's events

Women's events

Figure skating

Ice hockey

Luge

Nordic combined

Ski jumping

Speed skating

Men's events

Women's events

See also
1972 Winter Olympics medal table

External links

1972
1972 Winter Olympics